Events from the year 1795 in Sweden

Incumbents
 Monarch – Gustav IV Adolf

Event's

 - The Lolotte Forssberg affair.

Births

 11 September – Henrik Reuterdahl, clergyman  (died 1870)
 11 June - Sara Torsslow, actress

Deaths
 11 February – Carl Michael Bellman, poet  (born 1740)
 12 February – Michelle Elisabeth d'Ivry, courtier and spy  (born 1731)
 20 April – Johan Henric Kellgren, poet and critic  (born 1751)
 30 August - Elis Schröderheim, politician  (born 1757)
 October - Christina Nyman, brewer (born 1719)
 6 December - Sofia Liljegren, opera singer (born 1765)
 20 December - Charlotta Sparre, courtier  (born 1719)

References

 
Years of the 18th century in Sweden